Gabriel Bucelin (also Gabriel Buzlin, Gabriel Bincelint, or Gabriel Bucelinus) (29 December 1599, Diessenhofen, Thurgau – 9 June 1681, Weingarten) was a Benedictine polymath, Humanist, historical writer and cartographer.

Life
A scion of the distinguished line of Bucellini counts, Gabriel, at the age of thirteen, entered the Benedictine monastery at Weingarten. After a course in philosophy and theology at the Jesuit University of Dillingen he was ordained a priest on April 23, 1624. In the same year he was sent, as master of novices, to restore the primitive fervour and raise the standard of studies in the monastery of St. Trudpert in the Black Forest. In 1627 he became secretary to Abbott Franz Dietrich and to the Swabian Benedictine congregation. He filled the position of master of novices at Weingarten and professor of humanities at Feldkirch (1635), from which on the approach of the Swedish army he was forced to flee to Vienna, Venice, and finally Admont (1646). There he was appointed prior of St. John's monastery, Feldkirch (1651), where he remained until a few months before his death, when he returned to Weingarten.

Works
Bucelin was a universal scholar and a very prolific writer, being the author of some fifty-three works on genealogy, world history, hagiography and church history. He also drew maps and plans. A large number of his works are still in manuscript in the state library at Stuttgart. Many of his works remained unpublished, perhaps because of the disruptions of war. His chief claim to contemporary fame lies in the fact that he was, if not the first, at least among the first authors to deal with the ecclesiastical history of Germany. Of his published works the most important are:

Germania sacra (Augsburg, 1655), containing accounts of the principal ecclesiastics, archbishops, abbots, etc., as well as a list of the most important monasteries of Germany
Germaniae topo-chrono-stemmatographia sacra et profana (1655–78), treating, as its name implies, of the genealogy of the most distinguished members of the clergy and the nobility
Constantia sacra et profana (Frankfort, 1667)
Rhaetia etrusca, romana, gallica, germanica (Augsburg, 1661)
Nuclei Historiae universalis cum sacrae... (Ulm, 1650, 1654; carried from 1650 to 1735 by Schmier, Apparatum ad theologiam scholastico-polemico-practicam), of great importance to scholars interested in ancient charts, bulls, diplomata, etc.

Bucelin was also the author of many works on the Benedictine Order and its most illustrious members, among them Aquila imperii benedictina (Venice, 1651), Annales Benedictini (Vienna 1655, Augsburg 1656) and Menologium benedictinum (Feldkirch, 1655).

References
 Claudia Maria Neesen: Gabriel Bucelin OSB (1599-1681). Leben und historiographisches Werk. Thorbecke, Ostfildern 2003, 
 Thomas J. Stump: Mit Stift und Zirkel. Gabriel Bucelinus, 1599-1681, als Zeichner und Kartograph, Architekt und Kunstfreund. Thorbecke, Sigmaringen 1976,  
This article incorporates text from the 1913 Catholic Encyclopedia article "Gabriel Bucelin" by F.M. Rudge, a publication now in the public domain.

External links

His work as a cartographer

1599 births
1681 deaths
German Benedictines
17th-century German historians
German Renaissance humanists
People from Frauenfeld District
German male non-fiction writers